Megan Hall is a South African writer. She was born in 1972 and lives in Cape Town, and graduated from the University of Cape Town with a BA Honours degree, following an undergraduate degree in English and Latin.   Her first volume of poems, Fourth Child, (Modjaji Books, 2007) won the Ingrid Jonker Prize for 2008.  For many years, she was Publishing Manager for Dictionaries and Literature at Oxford University Press, but left in 2018 and is now freelancing.

References

Living people
South African women poets
Year of birth missing (living people)